Sthenoprocris is a genus of moths of the family Zygaenidae, containing only two species. It is known from Madagascar.

Species
Sthenoprocris brondeli	Viette, 1978
Sthenoprocris malgassica Hampson, 1920

References
Hampson 1920a. On new genera and species of Lepidoptera Phalaenae, with the characters of two new families. - Novitates Zoologicae 26(2):253–282 (on page 275)

Procridinae
Zygaenidae genera